Redrock Media is a media company based/their headquarters in St. George, Utah, in the United States.  The company owns four FM radio stations in St. George, Utah. 

Formally known as Simmers Media, owner Craig Hanson changed the name to Redrock Broadcasting in 2016.

Radio stations
 KRQX-FM-98.9 FM - Format: Classic Hits
 KURR-FM-103.1 FM - Format: CHR
 KUTQ-FM-102.3 FM - Format: Country
 KZYN-104.1 FM - Format: Classic Rock

Employees
 Craig Hanson - President and CEO
 Mike Evans - Director of Sales / General Sales Manager
 Terry Mathis - Digital Sales Manager
 Bryan Benware - Operations Manager / Program Director KRQX
 Jasmine Weaver - Program Director - KURR, Social Media Specialist
 Glen S. Hanson - Traffic Director
 Dave Hiatt - Production Manager / Program Director KUTQ. KZYN
 Myrna Hintze - Business Development Specialist
 Joseph Carson - News and Public Affairs Director

References

External links
 

Mass media companies of the United States
Radio broadcasting companies of the United States